Karl Brand (born 30 January 1941) is a Swiss former racing cyclist. He was the Swiss National Road Race champion in 1968. He also rode in the 1967 and 1968 Tour de France.

References

External links
 

1941 births
Living people
People from Seeland District
Swiss male cyclists
Sportspeople from the canton of Bern